Bugweri District  is a district in Busoga region, Eastern Uganda.

References

Districts of Uganda